Merrimac (also Merrimack) is an unincorporated community in Taylor County, Kentucky, United States.  It lies along local roads a short distance east of Route 337, northeast of the city of Campbellsville, the county seat of Taylor County.  Its elevation is 797 feet (243 m).

References

Unincorporated communities in Taylor County, Kentucky
Unincorporated communities in Kentucky